Lilka is a South Korean YouTuber and live streamer.

Life 
Lilka was born in Poitiers, France from Korean parents who studied arts at October 21, 1991.
 Lilka graduated from Ewha Womans University and majored in French Language & Literature. During college, she went to Lille Catholic University as an exchange student and stayed for a year. After graduation, she worked at Air France as a flight attendant for language interpretation.

Lilka was a Twitch streamer until Twitch suspended Lilka's accounts without warning in January 2018 and claiming that she abused viewbot. Then, Lilka moved to AfreecaTV and YouTube. In 2019, she became an K-league ambassador. In February 2019, she became a cover model of Maxim Korea. She visited Suwon World Cup Stadium and made special event with Gamst and Suwon Samsung Bluewings at May 4, 2019.

She is a fan of Cesinha who plays for Daegu FC. She visited DGB Daegu Bank Park and made special event with Daegu FC on August 17, 2019. She has also done online game broadcasting, such as Black Desert Online. In 2021, she appeared in The Super Junior Future Revolutionary Group which is a web entertainment about mobile game Marvel Future Revolution.

References

External links 
 Lilka's broadcasting station on AfreecaTV
 

1990 births
Living people
South Korean YouTubers
Gaming-related YouTube channels
Gaming YouTubers
South Korean association football commentators
Flight attendants
People from Poitiers
Ewha Womans University alumni
AfreecaTV streamers